Tris(dimethylamino)aluminium dimer, formally bis(μ-dimethylamino)tetrakis(dimethylamino)dialuminium, is an amide complex of aluminium. This compound may be used as a precursor to other aluminium complexes.

Commercially available, this compound may be prepared from lithium dimethylamide and aluminium trichloride.

References

Aluminium compounds
Metal amides
Dimers (chemistry)